The following places are called Milton in Minnesota

Austin Township, Mower County, Minnesota contains the unincorporated community of Two Rivers, also known as Milton.
Milton Township, Dodge County, Minnesota
Burnside Township, Goodhue County, Minnesota was formerly named Milton.